Ice dam may refer to:
 An ice jam on a river 
 glacier blocking an unfrozen river, creating a proglacial lake
 Ice formation on the eave of a roof